Software/Configware Co-Compilation is used for reconfigurable computing to generate the code for both, an instruction-stream-based microprocessor and a reconfigurable accelerator interfaced to it. Such a co-compiler (see figure) has a partitioner which accepts input from a high level language source, such as, for instance a programming language, or the output from tools like MATLAB, and automatically partitions it into parallelizable parts suitable for the reconfigurable accelerator and the rest for running on the microprocessor. By loop transformations the partitioner converts the parallelizable parts into a configware source, which is compiled by a Configware Compiler generating configware code for the configuration of the reconfigurable accelerator like, for instance an FPGA, or a coarse-grained reconfigurable array, and flowware code for organizing the data streams going from and to the accelerator.

Further reading
1995 J. Becker, et al.: A Novel Two-Level Hardware/Software Co-Design Framework; Journal of the Brazilian Computer Society, Special Issue on Electronic Design Automation, Dec. 1995
1995 J. Becker, et al.: A Profiling-driven Hardware/Software Partitioning of High-Level Language Specifications; Workshop on Logic and Architecture Synthesis, Grenoble, France, Dec. 1995
1996  J. Becker, et al.: CoDe-X: A Novel Two-Level Hardware/Software Co-Design Framework; 9th International Conference on VLSI Design, Bangalore, India, Jan. 1996

External links
Juergen Becker: A Partitioning Compiler for Computers with Xputer-based Accelerators; Ph. D. thesis, 1995

Compilers
Reconfigurable computing